Oola is a village in County Limerick, Ireland

Oola may also refer to:

Places
 Oola, Bhutan, a village in central-southern Bhutan
 Oola, Estonia, a village in Rapla Parish, Rapla County, northwestern Estonia

Other uses
 Oola, a Star Wars character

See also
 Ola (disambiguation)
 Oula (disambiguation)